Reginald Fuller may refer to: 
 Reginald C. Fuller (1908–2011), English biblical scholar, ecumenist, and Roman Catholic priest
 Reginald H. Fuller (1915–2007), Anglo-American biblical scholar, ecumenist, and Anglican priest